András Török (born 7 September 1978) is a professional squash player who represented Hungary. He reached a career-high world ranking of World No. 73 in June 2000.

References

External links 

Hungarian squash players
Living people
1978 births
Sportspeople from Budapest
Competitors at the 2013 World Games